Pioneer Peak may refer to:

 Pioneer Peak (Alaska) in Alaska, United States
 Pioneer Peak (British Columbia) in British Columbia, Canada
 Pioneer Peak (Nunavut) in Nunavut, Canada
 Pioneer Peak (Pakistan) in the Karakoram, Pakistan
 Pioneer Peak (Utah) in Utah, United States